Euopsis is a genus of lichen-forming fungi in the family Harpidiaceae. The genus contains two species. The genus was circumscribed by Finnish botanist William Nylander in 1881.

Species
Euopsis granatina 
Euopsis pulvinata

References

Pezizomycotina
Ascomycota families
Taxa described in 1881
Taxa named by William Nylander (botanist)
Lichen genera